Israeli criticism of the Occupation refers to the voices among Israelis (both Jews and non-Jews)  who have been highly critical of the occupation and settlement of the West Bank and the Gaza Strip since 1967.

Jewish opposition to Zionism has a long history, and many Israeli scholars and critics have been harsh in their judgements of the way their state has carried out its settlement and control policies in the Palestinian territories. Many Israeli organizations such as B'Tselem, Yesh Din, Ta'ayush, Rabbis for Human Rights, Gush Shalom, and Machsom Watch are active in the West Bank and both assist and document the plight of Palestinians under occupation.  Former soldiers with direct experience of the realities of the occupation also provide extensive critical witness.

At the very beginning of the Occupation the devout rabbi and philosopher Yeshayahu Leibowitz thought the occupation of the West Bank and Gaza would imperil Judaism itself,  and advocated immediate withdrawal. As the years passed, his antagonism to Israel's military successes led him to speak of "Judeo-Nazis" and the "Nazification of Israeli society", a position which did not stop him being nominated for the Israel Prize in 1993 by the government of Yitzhak Rabin. Israeli demographer Oren Yiftachel considers not only the settlement policy in the West Bank, but the state of Israel itself as an example of a Judaizing ethnocratic regime, which he defines as one that "promote(s) the expansion of the dominant group in contested territory and its domination of power structures while maintaining a democratic façade." The activist Jeff Halper speaks of a "matrix of control" underlying the occupation,  while the Israeli philosopher Avishai Margalit, following the Indologist David Dean Shulman, speaks of its "intricate machinery". Neve Gordon analyses at length the attempts to so normalize things that an "invisible occupation" is created.

For Baruch Kimmerling, the process of Israeli policies constituted what he called politicide, "the dissolution of the Palestinian people's existence as a legitimate social, political and economic entity" Yoav Peled has described Israel and its occupational policies as constituting a Neoliberal Warfare State. Zeev Sternhell has argued that the West Bank for the radical right is the touchstone of Zionism, serving as a staging post or territorial basis from which to challenge the secular state of Israel and what they perceive to be its Hellenization on the other side of the Green Line. Uri Avnery, critical of what he saw as the militarization of Israeli society, insisted to his dying day on "looking up" optimistically, for, "If we keep on looking down, at our feet, we will die from sorrow." Avraham Burg in reply to a Haaretz journalist who quipped that Burg's views were an existential threat to the state of Israel, remarked
Tell me something. How can it be that I have been a Jew for two thousand years, without a gun, without planes, without two hundred atomic bombs, and I never for a day feared for the existence and eternity of the Jewish people? And you – the Israeli – you've been armed to the teeth for sixty years, with troops and special forces, with capabilities the Jewish people never had, never had, and every day you are scared, perpetually terrified that this day is your last.

Ronit Lentin, following Shlomo Swirsky, suggests that a central function of settlement is psychological, a means of overcoming a "self-perceived Israeli-Jewish victimhood" complex. This position is similar to that espoused by the philosopher of science and Auschwitz survivor Yehuda Elkana  and has support from empirical studies of Israeli media portrayals of the conflict, which highlight incidents of violence, and play into historic anxieties, such as those drawing on the collective memories of existential threats and the Holocaust to produce a "siege mentality" productive of the same distrust that Palestinians nurture from the sense of victimhood as an occupied people.

Notes

Citations

Sources

Israeli-occupied territories
Israeli–Palestinian conflict
West Bank
West Bank